66 may refer to:

 66 (number)
 One of the years 66 BC, AD 66, 1966, 2066
"66" (song), a song by Lil Yachty featuring Trippie Redd
66, a song by The Afghan Whigs, from the album 1965
Sixty-Six (card game), a German card game
Sixty Six (film), a 2006 film
Sixty-Six, a novel by film director Barry Levinson

See also
Order 66 (disambiguation)
Phillips 66, an American multinational energy company
U.S. Route 66, a historic U.S. highway
WNBC (AM), on frequency 660 AM, was commonly referred historically as "66 WNBC"